Amaravai  is a village in Manopadu Mandal in Jogulamba Gadwal district of Telangana state, India.

References

Villages in Jogulamba Gadwal district
Manopadu